Tessellota is a genus of moths in the family Erebidae.

Species
 Tessellota cancellata Burmeister, 1878
 Tessellota pura Breyer, 1957
 Tessellota trifasciata Burmeister, 1878

References

Natural History Museum Lepidoptera generic names catalog

Phaegopterina
Moth genera